Wallace B. Mendelson is an American psychiatrist and author, working primarily in the fields of sleep research and psychopharmacology. He most recently worked at the University of Chicago as a professor of psychiatry and clinical pharmacology and the director of the school's Sleep Research Laboratory. He is the author of thirteen books and numerous papers in the fields of sleep science and pharmacology.

Education

Mendelson earned his Bachelor of Arts in 1965 from the University of Texas at Austin. He then went on to Washington University in St. Louis where he earned his Doctor of Medicine in 1969. He completed his residency in psychiatry and taught at Washington University.

Career
After Washington University, in 1975 Mendelson took a position at the Intramural Program of the National Institute of Mental Health (NIMH) in Bethesda, Maryland where he was the Chief, Section on Sleep Studies until 1987. While with the NIMH, Mendelson published two books: Human Sleep and Its Disorders (1977) and The Use and Misuse of Sleeping Pills (1980). After the NIMH, Mendelson became the director of the Center for the Study of Sleep and Waking at the State University of New York at Stony Brook and held a professorship there. He also published his third book while at Stony Brook called Human Sleep: Research and Clinical Care in 1987. In 1994, he was named the director of the Sleep Disorders Center at the Cleveland Clinic in Cleveland, Ohio.

From 1997 to 1998, Mendelson served as the President of the Sleep Research Society. He began working at the University of Chicago as a professor of psychiatry and clinical pharmacology and the director of the Sleep Research Laboratory. He retired from full-time university work in the early 2000s and has subsequently been writing, consulting, and in the part-time practice of general psychiatry. During his tenures at Stony Brook, the Cleveland Clinic, and The University of Chicago, he set up three accredited fellowship training programs in sleep medicine. Since 2017, Mendelson published a number of books, including The Science of Sleep, Understanding Antidepressants, Understanding Sleeping Pills, Understanding Medicines for Anxiety, The Curious History of Medicines in Psychiatry, Molecules, Madness, and Malaria, Nepenthe's Children, Trial by Fire, Fragile Brilliance, The Psychoanalyst and The Nazi Nobelist  and The Battle Over the Butterflies of the Soul.

Research
Mendelson is known for basic science studies elucidating the effects of inverse agonists of the benzodiazepine receptor, the actions of endogenous ligands for benzodiazepine receptors, and the role of the medial preoptic area in pharmacologic sleep induction. At a human research level he characterized differences in regulation of growth hormone secretion during sleep and waking, effects of drugs on the perception of being awake or asleep, the interaction of sleep and depression, and the clinical properties of sleep-inducing medicines. Mendelson has been described as a "pioneer in the field of sleep research and sleep medicine, and is a well-respected psychiatrist, scientist, and sleep educator." In 2022 he was designated a ‘Living Legend in Sleep Research’ by the journal Sleep Advances in which he published a history of his work, memories of colleagues and mentors, and thoughts for the future.

Bibliography

References

External links
Official website

Living people
1945 births
American psychiatrists
University of Texas at Austin alumni
American male writers
Washington University School of Medicine faculty
Washington University School of Medicine alumni
Stony Brook University faculty
University of Chicago faculty